New Tupton United Football Club was an English association football club based in Tupton, Derbyshire. It competed in the FA Cup in the early 1920s.

References

Defunct football clubs in Derbyshire
Defunct football clubs in England